Stephen Barlow may refer to:

Stephen Barlow (conductor) (born 1954), British conductor
Stephen Barlow (director) (born 1973), Australian opera director
Stephen Barlow (Pennsylvania politician) (1779–1845), member of the U.S. House of Representatives
Steve Barlow of The Two Steves
Stephen Hart Barlow (1895–1962), Quartermaster General of New Jersey
Stephen Steele Barlow (1818–1900), Attorney General of Wisconsin, legislator

See also
Barlow (surname)